HC Visé BM is a men's handball club from Visé, Belgium, that plays in the Belgian First Division and in the BeNe League.

Crest, colours, supporters

Kits

European record

Team

Current squad 
Squad for the 2016–17 season

Goalkeepers
 Mehdi Chaidron
 Konstantinos Gourgoumis 
 Jonathan Lupica 
 Claudiu Rotarescu
 Kevin Siraut

Wingers
RW
  Nicolas Danse 
  Marko Popivoda
LW 
  Dominique Cutaia
  Lucas Dubuc
  Antoine Eubelen
  Sebastien Gava
Line players 
  Emmanuel Beckers
  Thomas Mormont
  Loic Van Looy
  Yves Vancosen
  Jonathan Vandeberg 

Back players
LB
  Benjamin Danesi 
  Sebastien Jurdan
CB 
  Stephane Geradon
  Florian Glesner 
  Martin Massat 
RB
  Pierre Brixhe
  Matej Flajs
  Louis Marchal

External links
Official website

HC Visé BM
Visé